This national electoral calendar for 2015 lists the national/federal elections held in 2015 in all sovereign states and their dependent territories. By-elections are excluded, though national referendums are included.

January
4 January: Uzbekistan, Legislative Chamber (2nd round)
8 January: Sri Lanka, President
11 January: Croatia, President (2nd round)
20 January: Zambia, President
25 January: 
Comoros, Parliament (1st round)
Greece, Parliament

February
7 February: Slovakia, Referendum
16 February: Saint Kitts and Nevis, Parliament
22 February: Comoros, Parliament (2nd round)
28 February: Lesotho, National Assembly

March
1 March: 
Andorra, Parliament
El Salvador, Parliament
Estonia, Parliament
Tajikistan, Assembly of Representatives
3 March: Federated States of Micronesia, Parliament
8 March: Switzerland, Referendums
17 March: Israel, Parliament
28–29 March: Nigeria, President, House of Representatives and Senate
29 March: Uzbekistan, President
31 March: Tuvalu, Parliament

April
11 April: Malta, Referendum
13–15 April: Sudan, President and National Assembly
19 April: 
Finland, Parliament
Northern Cyprus, President (1st round)
22 April: Anguilla, Legislature
25 April: Togo, President
26 April: 
Benin, Parliament
Kazakhstan, President
Northern Cyprus, President (2nd round)

May
3 May: Nagorno-Karabakh, Parliament
7 May: United Kingdom, House of Commons
8 May: Norfolk Island, Referendum
10 May: Poland, President (1st round)
11 May: 
Guyana, President and Parliament
22 May: Ireland, Constitutional Referendums
24 May: 
Ethiopia, House of Peoples' Representatives
Poland, President (2nd round)
25 May: Suriname, Parliament

June
7 June: 
Luxembourg, Referendum
Mexico, Chamber of Deputies
Turkey, Parliament
8 June: British Virgin Islands, Legislature
14 June: Switzerland, Referendums
18 June: Denmark, Parliament
29 June: Burundi, National Assembly

July
5 July: Greece, Referendum
21 July: Burundi, President

August
9 August: Haiti,  and  
17 August: Sri Lanka, Parliament

September
1 September: Faroe Islands, Legislature
6 September: 
Guatemala, President (1st round) and Parliament
Poland, Referendum
7 September: Trinidad and Tobago, House of Representatives
11 September: Singapore, Parliament
20 September: Greece, Parliament

October
3 October: United Arab Emirates, Parliament
4 October: 
Kyrgyzstan, Parliament
Portugal, Parliament
11 October: 
Belarus, President
Guinea, President
17–19 October: Egypt, Parliament (1st phase 1st round)
18 October: Switzerland, National Council and 
19 October: Canada, House of Commons
25 October: 
Argentina, President (1st round), Chamber of Deputies and Senate
Bulgaria, Referendum
Guatemala, President (2nd round)
Haiti, President (1st round) (election nullified),  and 
Ivory Coast, President
Oman, Consultative Assembly
Poland, Sejm and Senate
Republic of the Congo, Constitutional Referendum
Tanzania, President and Parliament
26–28 October: Egypt, Parliament (1st phase 2nd round)

November
1 November: 
Azerbaijan, Parliament
Turkey, Parliament
2 November: Switzerland, 
4 November: 
Belize, House of Representatives
Pitcairn Islands, Deputy Mayor and Legislature
8 November: 
Croatia, Parliament
Myanmar, House of Representatives and House of Nationalities
Switzerland, 
15 November: Switzerland, 
16 November: Marshall Islands, Parliament
20 November – 11 December: New Zealand, Referendum (1st round)
21–23 November: Egypt, Parliament (2nd phase 1st round)
22 November: 
Argentina, President (2nd round)
Switzerland, 
26 November: Gibraltar, Legislature
29 November: 
Burkina Faso, President and Parliament
Transnistria, Parliament
30 November – 2 December: Egypt, Parliament (2nd phase 2nd round)

December
3 December: Denmark, Referendum
3–5 December: Seychelles, President (1st round)
6 December: 
Armenia, Referendum
Venezuela, Parliament
9 December: Saint Vincent and the Grenadines, Parliament
13 December: Liechtenstein, Referendum
13–14 December: Central African Republic, Referendum
16–18 December: Seychelles, President (2nd round)
18 December: Rwanda, Referendum
20 December: 
Slovenia, Referendum
Spain, Congress of Deputies
30 December: 
Central African Republic, President (1st round)
Kiribati, Parliament (1st round)

Indirect elections
The following indirect elections of heads of state and the upper houses of bicameral legislatures took place through votes in elected lower houses, unicameral legislatures, or electoral colleges: 
23 April 2014 – 31 October 2016: Lebanon, President (17 rounds in 2015)
10 January: Afghanistan, House of Elders
13–14 January: Uzbekistan, Senate
29–31 January: Italy, President
7 February, 20 April and 28 September: India, Council of States
18 February: Greece, President
5 March: Pakistan, Senate
16 March, 6 May and 22 June: Isle of Man, Legislative Council
1 April: San Marino, Captains Regent
17 April: Tajikistan, National Assembly
11 May: Federated States of Micronesia, President
19 May: Sudan, Council of States
24 May: Ethiopia, House of Federation
26 May: Netherlands, Senate
3 June: Latvia, President
4 June: Mauritius, President
16 June, 9 July, 23 October and 24 November: Austria, Federal Council
14 July: Suriname, President
24 July: Burundi, Senate
1 October: San Marino, Captains Regent
2 October: Morocco, House of Councillors
12 October: Fiji, President
28 October: Nepal, President
27 November: Namibia, National Council
9 December: Switzerland, Federal Council
20 December: Spain, Senate
29 December: 
Algeria, Council of the Nation
Madagascar,

See also
2015 in politics

References

National
National
Political timelines of the 2010s by year
National